The Athletic Federation of Yugoslavia (Serbo croatian Atletski Savez Jugoslavije) was the governing body for the sport of athletics in Yugoslavia. It was founded on 11.IX 1921 in Zagreb as Yugoslav Light Athletics Federation (JLAS - Jugoslavenski lakoatletski savez).

Affiliations 
International Association of Athletics Federations (IAAF)
European Athletic Association (EAA)
Yugoslav Olympic Committee

National records 
ASJ maintained the Yugoslav records in athletics.

External links 
Facebook Page

Athletics in Yugoslavia
YUG
Sports governing bodies in Yugoslavia
National governing bodies for athletics